YJ or yJ may refer to:

Arts and entertainment:
 Yahoo! Japan, a website
 Young Justice, a DC comic series 
 Young Justice (TV series), TV series aired on Cartoon Network
 Young Justice: Legacy, video games based on the TV series
 Yakitate!! Japan, an anime
 Weekly Young Jump, a magazine

Other uses:
 Yoctojoule (yJ = 10−24  J), an SI unit of energy
 Yottajoule (YJ = 1024  J), an SI unit of energy
 Jeep Wrangler, an SUV
 Young Judaea, a Zionist youth movement